Ajith Kumara Galbokka Hewage is a Sri Lankan politician and a member of the Parliament of Sri Lanka.

References
 

Living people
Members of the 13th Parliament of Sri Lanka
Members of the 14th Parliament of Sri Lanka
Janatha Vimukthi Peramuna politicians
United People's Freedom Alliance politicians
1973 births